van Tongeren is a surname of Dutch origin. People with the name include:
Hans van Tongeren (1955–1982), Dutch film actor
Jack van Tongeren (born 1947), Australian white supremacist and right-wing activist
Jacoba van Tongeren (born 1903), Dutch resistance fighter
Jelle van Tongeren (born 1980), Dutch jazz violin virtuoso
John Van Tongeren (contemporary), film and television music composer
Ko van Tongeren (1913–1996), Dutch Olympic canoeist

Dutch-language surnames
Surnames of Dutch origin